Psodos is a genus of moths in the family Geometridae first described by Treitschke in 1825.

Species
Psodos quadrifaria (Sulzer, 1776)
Psodos sajana Wehrli, 1919

References

Gnophini